Courageous Love is a romantic drama film about a newly appointed engineering company president who falls in love with one of his employees while working undercover at a different branch office. It was produced by Crystal Creek Media and directed by Daniel Knudsen. Filming of Courageous Love took place in the summer of 2014 near Detroit, Michigan, with some additional photography taking place on location in New York City.

Plot 
Courageous Love is about a young man named Alex Shelby who is appointed president of his father's company Shelby Engineering shortly after his parents are tragically killed. At the annual company banquet a server accidentally pours punch all over Alex. He then goes to the kitchen and puts on an apron to cover up the spill. After that he begins helping the cooks with the event instead of attending as the newly appointed president.  The company is floundering financially as new building contracts dry up. Under pressure Alex signs an unwise contract landing him in a situation to finish a building on a very tight deadline. A purchase order mix-up causes the building to be delayed due to the delivery of wrong materials. Michelle Long, who is the head of purchasing at the Manhattan branch of Shelby's company, takes the fall for this delay. When Alex comes to Manhattan to work things out at the downtown office, Michelle remembers him as the caterer from the banquet. On the spur of the moment, Alex tells her that he is a new employee at this office. He then works undercover to figure out what went wrong with the building project. While working undercover as a graphic designer, Alex and Michelle fall in love. Alex is forced to make tough decisions when he has to choose between saving his company or his relationship with Michelle.

Cast 
 Jared Withrow as Alex Shelby
 Jessica Koloian as Michelle Long
 Kristina Kaylen as Kayla Long
 Patricia Mauceri as Jenny Sánchez
 Tim Kaiser as John Grame
 Holly Houk as Julie Shelby
 Michael Tremblay as Darren Chambers
 Nathan Jacobson as Clay Dorcette
 Kurt Hierholzer as Ron
 Greg Wolfe as Storman
 Daniel Knudsen as Jason Kwilos

Production 
Principal photography for Courageous Love took place in June 2014. Various locations in and around the Detroit, Michigan, area were used for filming. This movie is actress Patricia Mauceri's first film performance since her role of Carlotta Vega on the ABC soap opera, One Life to Live.

Release 
Courageous Love premiered at Emagine Novi and will release February 14, 2017. Crystal Creek Media is partnering with Pure Flix Entertainment for a streaming release on the PureFlix platform. The movie was originally titled “Rather to be Chosen” but was changed to “Courageous Love” shortly before the wide release of the film. The Dove seal of family approval was awarded to Courageous Love by the Dove Foundation.

Awards 
Courageous Love was featured at the 2017 Winnipeg Film Festival along with Queen of Katwe and Star Wars: The Force Awakens. Courageous Love won the audience choice award for Best Independent Feature. The film was also an official selection at the 2016 Christian Worldview Film Festival.

References

External links 
 
 Crystal Creek Media
 

2017 films
2017 romantic drama films
2017 independent films
American romantic drama films
Films set in New York City
Films about horses
Films about Christianity
Films shot in Michigan
American independent films
2010s English-language films
Films directed by Daniel Knudsen
2010s American films